Markee White (born October 4, 1983) is a professional gridiron football wide receiver who is currently a free agent. He was signed by the St. Louis Rams as an undrafted free agent in 2007. He played college football at Texas State.

White has also played for the Spokane Shock, Calgary Stampeders, Hartford Colonials, Jacksonville Sharks, Los Angeles Kiss and Philadelphia Soul.

Early years
White was a multi-sport athlete in high school and college. White attended Long Beach Polytechnic High School and Texas State University.

Professional career

St. Louis Rams
White debuted for the St. Louis Rams, however was released in the offseason.

Spokane Shock
White joined the Spokane Shock on October 15, 2010. He would go on to have a storybook season with 66 receptions for 925 yards with 18 touchdowns. He helped the Shock reach ArenaBowl XXIII where they defeated the Tampa Bay Storm. White earned the Offensive player of the game for the ArenaBowl in 2010.

Hartford Colonials
On August 24, 2010, White signed a contract with the Hartford Colonials of the UFL.

Calgary Stampeders
White signed was signed by the Calgary Stampeders on March 12, 2012.

Arizona Rattlers
White signed with the Rattlers on April 25, 2012. He helped the Rattlers reach ArenaBowl XXV where the Rattlers defeated the Philadelphia Soul. White earned his second career ArenaBowl Championship with Arizona, after winning his first with the Spokane Shock two seasons earlier in ArenaBowl XXIII.

Jacksonville Sharks
White was traded to the Jacksonville Sharks on March 16, 2013.

Los Angeles Kiss
White was traded to the Los Angeles Kiss on December 17, 2013 for waiver positioning.

Philadelphia Soul
White was traded to the Philadelphia Soul on May 14, 2014 for waiver positioning.

Return to Arizona
On March 18, 2015, White returned to the Rattlers.

References

1983 births
Living people
Players of American football from Long Beach, California
Players of Canadian football from Long Beach, California
Texas State Bobcats football players
St. Louis Rams players
Spokane Shock players
Hartford Colonials players
Arizona Rattlers players
Calgary Stampeders players
Jacksonville Sharks players
Los Angeles Kiss players
Philadelphia Soul players